Benteng is an administrative district in the Selayar Islands Regency, South Sulawesi, Indonesia. It is the administrative capital of the Selayar Islands Regency and is located on the seafront where the means of transport from outside the closest is Benteng Pier. The nearest airport and is the only airport H. Aroeppala Airport located in Padang few miles south of Benteng Bontosunggu precisely in the village, Bontoharu District, Selayar Islands Regency. Capital city is the administrative district Benteng Citadel.

Demographics

References

External links
  wikisource/Pariwisata selayar tahun 2010
  wikisource/Penduduk & ketenagakerjaan selayar tahun 2010

Regency seats of South Sulawesi
Selayar Islands